Amblychilepas nigrita, common name the black keyhole limpet, is a species of sea snail, a marine gastropod mollusk in the family Fissurellidae, the keyhole limpets.

Description
The size of the shell varies between 10 mm and 25 mm.

Distribution
This marine species occurs off Southern Queensland, Western Australia and off Tasmania in shallow water under stones.

References

External links
 Memoirs of the National Museum of Victoria, vol. 27, 1966, p.207
 

Fissurellidae
Gastropods described in 1834